Lenzites elegans, also known as Trametes elegans and Daedalea elegans, is a common polypore and wood-decay fungus with a pantropical distribution found on hardwood hosts in regions including Australia, New Zealand, and Japan.

References 

Polyporaceae
Fungal plant pathogens and diseases
Fungi described in 1820